Decemberunderground is the seventh studio album by American rock band AFI, released on June 6, 2006, through Interscope Records.  The album was supported by three singles, "Miss Murder", "Love Like Winter", and "The Missing Frame".

Recording
Over 120 songs were written for the album, the majority of them never finished or released.

Recording took place at Conway Recording Studios and Sage & Sound Recording Studios in Los Angeles, California. Sessions were produced by Jerry Finn with Joe McGrath handling recording. They were assisted by engineers Seth Waldmann, Jason Gossman, Kevin Mills, Eric Weaver, Dimitar Krnjaic and Keith Armstrong. In addition to Puget's programming and keyboards, Ronan Harris of VNV Nation and Dave McCracken contributed additional programming and keyboards. Finn and Chris Lord-Alge mixed the recordings at Conway Studios and Resonate Music. Ted Jensen mastered the recordings at Sterling Sound in New York City.

Music
Usually described as an alternative rock, emo and post-hardcore album, Decemberunderground contains a variety of genre elements in the various songs, including EDM, new wave, gothic rock, hardcore punk, synthwave and synthpop. Ed Thompson of IGN compared the album to bands such as U2, the Cure, the Smiths, Depeche Mode and Alphaville. Alternative Press compared the album to 1980s synthwave music.

Regarding the album's title, lead singer Davey Havok said, "Decemberunderground is a time and a place. It is where the cold can huddle together in darkness and isolation." The album's title is sung in a lyric in the song "The Interview".

Release
In late March 2006, the upcoming album was promoted by a cryptic contest known as "The Charlotte Mystery" that culminated in fans who solved the puzzles being invited to April 2006 private shows in Los Angeles, New York City, and San Francisco. Alongside this, the album's title was revealed, and was planned for release in three months' time. The album's lead single, "Miss Murder", was released to radio on April 24, 2006. The following day, the artwork and track listing for the album was posted online. The music video for "Miss Murder" premiered through MTV's Overdrive program on May 9, 2006. On May 24, 2006, a 10" picture disc was released featuring "Rabbits are Roadkill on Rt. 37" as the B-side.

In May 2006, they appeared at The Bamboozle and HFStival. Leading up to the album's release, listening parties were held across Canada and the US. Decemberunderground was made available for streaming on May 30, 2006, before being released on June 6, 2006. The iTunes version included "On the Arrow" and a cover of the Morrissey song "Jack the Ripper" (1992) as bonus tracks. Customers who pre-ordered the album at special pre-listening events received a CD of the "Miss Murder" single, which also contained a cover of INXS's song "Don't Change". The first pressing of the CD in the United States contained a limited edition insert with one of four band member portraits.

On June 8, 2006, the band appeared on MTV Movie & TV Awards, where they performed "Miss Murder". Between June and August 2006, the band appeared at select stops on the 2006 Warped Tour and played various headlining shows, with support from the Dillinger Escape Plan and Nightmare of You. Darker My Love supported the last few dates of the tour. In September 2006, the band appeared at the Bumbershoot festival, and went on a brief West Coast US tour with support from Tiger Army. "Love Like Winter" was released to radio on September 25, 2006; the song's music video was posted online two days later. Following this, the band played three shows in Germany, before embarking on a UK tour in October 2006, where they were supported by the Explosion and Dispute.

The album was re-released on November 7, 2006, on 6 "icy clear" 7-inch vinyl. The individual record sleeves featured band member portraits, as well as a portrait of the band's tour manager Smith Puget. That same month, they played three US shows with the Explosion and the Loved Ones that led into a short tour of New Zealand and Australia. They closed out the year headlining the 91X Nightmare Before Xmas radio festival, and playing an AOL Session, where they performed "Endlessly, She Said". On December 12, 2006, the band released the video album I Heard a Voice – Live from Long Beach Arena, which was filmed at Long Beach Arena earlier in the year.

In February 2007, they played a few East Coast shows with Sick of It All, which was followed by a few West Coast shows in the next month with Viva Hate and Love Equals Death. Preceded by one-off show in Mexico, AFI then went on a tour of Europe in April and May 2007, and appeared at Virgin Festival in Canada. AFI held their last concert in promotion of the album at Download Fest in October 2007. Havok and Puget then began to promote their side-project Blaqk Audio before beginning work on the eighth AFI album, Crash Love (2009).

Reception

Critical response
Decemberunderground received generally positive reviews. The review aggregator Metacritic awarded the album a 72 out of 100, based on 15 reviews.

Entertainment Weekly awarded the album a grade of B+, and called it a further development of the band's earlier shift to "an eerie, metal-edged Cure sound", with Decemberunderground representing "the most melodically acute distillation of that style yet," unlike their previous studio album Sing the Sorrow, which they awarded a D. AllMusic awarded the album 4 out of 5 stars, saying the band's "ever-evolving goth-punk" sound is present on Decemberunderground in a "tighter and lighter" form, showing that the "core of AFI's sound never strays too far from what listeners have grown to love about them in the first place."

Rolling Stone awarded the album 3 out of 5 stars, one less star than their review of Sing the Sorrow, and claimed that "something isn't right in the world of AFI," because of their pop-rock musical structure "that would be at home on the soundtrack to the next Spider-Man movie".

Commercial performance and accolades
It debuted at number one on the Billboard 200, selling 182,000 copies in its first week of being released. The album was certified gold by the Recording Industry Association of America (RIAA) on August 30, 2006, and has sold at least 993,000 copies in the United States as of September 2009. The album was eligible for platinum certification in 2007 and received it from RIAA in 2013.

Cleveland.com ranked "Miss Murder" at number 45 on their list of the top 100 pop-punk songs. Alternative Press ranked "Miss Murder" at number 30 on their list of the best 100 singles from the 2000s.

Track listing

Personnel 
Credits for Decemberunderground adapted from the album liner notes.

AFI
 Jade Puget – guitars, programming, keyboards
 Davey Havok – vocals
 Adam Carson – drums
 Hunter Burgan – bass, additional programming, keyboards

Additional musicians
 Ronan Harris – additional programming, keyboards
 Dave McCracken – additional programming, keyboards
 Nick 13 – additional background vocals
 Dan Under – additional background vocals
 Ralph Saenz – additional background vocals
 Jacquelyn Simley – additional background vocals
 Nikishia Grier – additional background vocals
 Ryan Wilson – additional background vocals
 Wedge – additional background vocals
 Jerry Finn – additional background vocals
 Joe McGrath – additional background vocals
 Brandan Schieppati – additional background vocals
 Keith Barney – additional background vocals
 "Precious" Steve Cunningham – additional background vocals
 Ryan J. Downey – additional background vocals
 Jeff Sagud – additional background vocals
 Gavin Rattmann – additional background vocals
 Luke Wood – additional background vocals
 The Despair Faction – additional background vocals

Production
 Jerry Finn – producer, mixing
 Chris Lord-Alge – mixing (tracks 3, 4, 6–8 and 10)
 Joe McGrath – recording
 Seth Waldmann – assistant engineer
 Jason Gossman – assistant engineer
 Kevin Mills – assistant engineer
 Eric Weaver – assistant engineer
 Dimitar Krnjaic – assistant engineer
 Keith Armstrong – assistant engineer
 Ted Jensen – mastering
 Morning Breath Inc. – art direction, design
 Alan Forbes – illustration
 James Minchin – photography

Bonus tracks and outtakes
All tracks recorded during the Decemberunderground sessions unless otherwise noted.

 "Rabbits are Roadkill on Rt. 37" was recorded during the Sing the Sorrow sessions, and was eventually released on the MySpace Records: Volume 1 compilation and as a bonus track on international editions of Decemberunderground.
 "Jack the Ripper" is a Morrissey cover and was available as a bonus track on the iTunes pre-ordered edition and the UK and Australian editions of the "Love Like Winter" single.
 "On the Arrow" was available as a bonus track on the iTunes pre-ordered edition and the Australian edition of the "Love Like Winter" single.
 Four tracks from the sessions, in addition to "100 Words" from the Sing the Sorrow sessions, were planned to be released on an extended play, originally planned for December 2007, but which never materialized.
"Carcinogen Crush", written by Burgan, was first recorded during the Sing the Sorrow sessions, but this version was not released. It was re-recorded during the Decemberunderground sessions and released as a downloadable track on the video game Guitar Hero III: Legends of Rock (2007). It was also made available as a digital single on iTunes on December 4, 2007, charting on two Canadian singles charts. It was later re-released on the Japanese edition of Crash Love and that album's "Medicate" single in the UK.
"Ether" was included in NASCAR 09s in-game soundtrack as well as on the Japanese edition of Crash Love.
 "The View from Here" leaked online in 2016.

Charts

Weekly charts

Year-end charts

Certifications

References

External links
 AFI's official website

2006 albums
AFI (band) albums
Albums produced by Jerry Finn
Interscope Records albums